WLWR-LP (107.7 FM) is a radio station licensed to Marinette, Wisconsin, United States. The station is currently owned by Marinette Radio Association.

References

External links
 

LWR-LP
LWR-LP